Rumba is a 1935 musical drama film starring George Raft as a Cuban dancer and Carole Lombard as a Manhattan socialite. The movie was directed by Marion Gering and is considered an unsuccessful follow-up to Raft and Lombard's smash hit Bolero the previous year.

Plot
In Havana, Cuba, an American dancer called Joe Martin has a winning lottery ticket. However wealthy socialite Diana Harrison also has a lottery ticket with the same number. Joe's ticket is counterfeit so he misses out on the money. Diana feels sorry for him and offers to back him in his own night club but then changes her mind after he tries to seduce her.

Joe then discovers the rumba dance when he visits his home town during a fiesta. He gets financial backing from a Texan to establish a new nightclub with Flash, his manager. Joe dances the rumba with Carmelita and is a big success.

Diana goes to opening night with her boyfriend Hobart Fletcher. She dances with Joe and they fall in love. However Carmelita helps break them up.

Back in New York Diana discovers that Joe left New York because he had evidence that would send a gang member to prison. Diana breaks up with Hobart. Joe reads about this, signs with a Broadway producer and returns to New York. Joe is threatened with death by gangsters but decides to perform anyway. Carmelita faints out of fear but Diana steps up and performs the rumba with Joe. The performance is a big success and it's revealed that the gangster threats was a publicity stunt.

Cast
George Raft as Joe Martin
Carole Lombard as Diana Harrison
Lynne Overman as Flash
Margo as Carmelita
Gail Patrick as Patsy Fletcher
Iris Adrian as Goldie Allen
Monroe Owsley as Fletcher Hobart
Jameson Thomas as Jack Solanger
Soledad Jimenez as Maria
Paul Porcasi as Carlos
Samuel S. Hinds as Henry B. Harrison
Virginia Hammond as Mrs. Harrison
Ann Sheridan as a Chorus Girl (uncredited)
Akim Tamiroff as Tony (uncredited)
Jane Wyman as a Chorus Girl (uncredited)
Jean Ross as a Chorus Girl (uncredited)

Production
The film was based on an original story by Guy Endore which was purchased by Paramount in September 1933 as a vehicle for Raft.

Filming took place in November and December 1934. The film starred Margot a Mexican dancer who had just made her film debut in Crime Without Passion.

Danvce team Veloz and Yolanda coached Lombard and Raft in the dance sequences. The signature rumba danced near the end by Raft and Lombard seems to be a simplified variation of rumba performed by Veloz and Yolanda themselves the year before in another Paramount film starring George Burns and Gracie Allen, Many Happy Returns.

George Raft reportedly fought with Lombard during the shoot and refused to make a film with her later. He claimed this was because Paramount assigned Ted Tetzlaff to shoot the film and on Rumba Raft thought Tetzlaff favored Lombard rather than him.

Reception
The film has been described as a box office flop and a hit.

The Los Angeles Times thought the story was even more "preposterous" than Bolero but felt it was a better movie due to its dancing, attractive women and music, calling the film "a sensory experience".

References

External links 
 
 
Review of fiml at Variety

1935 films
1930s romantic musical films
American musical drama films
American romantic drama films
American romantic musical films
American black-and-white films
Paramount Pictures films
Films directed by Marion Gering
Films set in Havana
Publicity stunts in fiction
1930s English-language films
1930s American films